Ultimate Jeopardy was a professional wrestling event produced by Extreme Championship Wrestling (ECW). The event took place in 1994, 1996 and 1997.

The 1995 event was scheduled for November 23, but was cancelled. The planned main event for that show was re-booked for the December 9 show, with some slight alterations to the lineup, becoming December to Dismember: Ultimate Jeopardy 1995. It was held in the ECW Arena, Philadelphia, Pennsylvania.

Dates and venues

References

External links

 
Recurring events established in 1994
Recurring events disestablished in 1997